Drypetes dolichocarpa (Chamorro: mwelel) is a species of tree in the family Putranjivaceae found in the Mariana Islands.

Gallery

References

dolichocarpa
Flora of the Mariana Islands